The 15th Mechanized Brigade is a mechanized brigade of the Romanian Land Forces. It was formed in July 1994 from the ex 15th Mechanized Regiment, and named after the "Battle of Podul Înalt". The brigade is currently subordinated to the 4th Infantry Division, and its headquarters are located in Iași.

Organization 2020 
 15th Mechanized Brigade "Podu Înalt", in Iași
 631st Tank Battalion "Oituz", in Bacău
 151st Infantry Battalion "Războieni", in Iași
 634th Infantry Battalion "Mareșal Jósef Piłsudski", in Piatra Neamț
 335th Artillery Battalion "Alexandru cel Bun", in Botoșani
 635th Anti-aircraft Defense Battalion "Precista", in Bacău
 198th Logistic Support Battalion "Prut", in Iași

References

External links

   Official Site of the Romanian Land Forces
  Official Site of the 15th Mechanized Brigade

Brigades of Romania
Military units and formations established in 1994